Mehmet Soyuer from the IBM Thomas J. Watson Research Center, Yorktown Heights, NY, was named Fellow of the Institute of Electrical and Electronics Engineers (IEEE) in 2016 for contributions to the design of high-frequency integrated circuits for clocking and communications.

References 

Fellow Members of the IEEE
Living people
Year of birth missing (living people)
Place of birth missing (living people)